Tage is a Scandinavian masculine given name.

Tage may also refer to:
 French cruiser Tage, launched 1886
 French ship Tage, launched 1847
 Lake Tage, in Indonesia

See also 
 Tages (disambiguation)